Karen Kay Sharpe (born September 20, 1934) is an American film and television actress. She is known for playing Laura Thomas in the American western television series Johnny Ringo.

Life and career 
Sharpe was born in San Antonio, Texas, the daughter of Dorothy Shrout and Kirk Howard Sharpe. Her father was a businessman and oilman. She was an ice skater in Hollywood, California and a student at the Hollywood Professional School. She studied dancing with ballet dancer and choreographer Adolph Bolm in Los Angeles, California.

Sharpe had unsuccessful screen tests while she worked as a model. After she was discovered by a talent scout, she began her career in 1952, starring in the film Army Bound. Sharpe also appeared in the films The Sniper, Bomba and the Jungle Girl, Holiday for Sinners, The Vanquished, Strange Fascination and Mexican Manhunt. She guest-starred in television programs, including Gunsmoke (1957 episode “Sweet and Sour”), Bonanza, Death Valley Days, Perry Mason, The Wild Wild West, The Texan, Rawhide, Gomer Pyle, U.S.M.C., Trackdown, Mickey Spillane's Mike Hammer, 77 Sunset Strip, The Man from U.N.C.L.E., The Millionaire and I Dream of Jeannie. In 1955, Sharpe won the Golden Globe Award in the category New Star of the Year – Actress for her acting performance as Nell Buck in the 1954 film The High and the Mighty, along with actresses, Shirley MacLaine and Kim Novak.

In 1959, Sharpe starred in the new CBS western television series Johnny Ringo, playing Laura Thomas. She retired in 1966, last appearing in the television film Valley of Mystery, playing Connie Lane.

Personal life 

Sharpe married Chester Stevens Marshall, an actor, in 1957. She later filed for divorce from Marshall, on the grounds that he had physically abused her. According to The Odessa American, due to beatings at the hands of Marshall, her rib cage was contused and her head was smashed into brickwork. The divorce became final on September 18, 1962. Chester Stevens Marshall was murdered at his home in 1974.

In the early 1960s Sharpe inherited her father's business, and spent several years running it in Texas before selling up and returning to California.

Sharpe subsequently married Stanley Kramer, a film director and producer, on September 1, 1966. They were married in Beverly Hills, California. They had two children, Jennifer and Katharine.

Sharpe settled in Seattle, Washington in 1978 and moved to Beverly Hills, California, in 1985.

In 2022, Sharpe revealed that she was sexually assaulted and harassed by comedian, actor, singer, director, producer, writer and humanitarian Jerry Lewis on the set of the 1964 film The Disorderly Orderly. She stated that Lewis had sent for Sharpe to come his office, whereupon he grabbed and fondled her, then unzipped his pants. Sharpe stated that "I was dumbstruck." She rebuffed his advances, which enraged Lewis so much that that was the last time she ever worked with him. Actress Hope Holiday shared that she was similarly sexually assaulted by Lewis.

References

External links 

Rotten Tomatoes profile

1934 births
Living people
People from San Antonio
Actresses from San Antonio
Actresses from Texas
American film actresses
American television actresses
20th-century American actresses
Western (genre) television actors
American models
New Star of the Year (Actress) Golden Globe winners
20th-century American women
21st-century American women